Koo Wee Rup Bypass is a short road in Victoria, Australia, linking Healesville-Koo Wee Rup Road more directly to South Gippsland Highway at Koo Wee Rup, subsequently bypassing Koo Wee Rup.

Route
Koo Wee Rup Bypass begins at the intersection with Healesville-Koo Wee Rup Road and Manks Road in northern Koo Wee Rup and runs south as a dual-lane, single-carriageway road to the west of the town, over the Bunyip River drains, to terminate at Rossiter Road shortly afterwards; the intersection with South Gippsland Highway is 500 metres away. It acts to remove through traffic, particularly heavy vehicles, from the town centre.

History
In August 2013, Lend Lease Engineering (formerly Abigroup) was awarded the contract to construct the bypass, including a new  bridge spanning the Bunyip River drains. Construction finished in May 2015, six months ahead of schedule, for a cost of $66 million. It was opened to traffic on 15 May 2015.

The bypass is the first stage of a major upgrade of Healesville-Koo Wee Rup Road, ultimately to convert it to freeway standard between South Gippsland Highway south of Koo Wee Rup and Princes Freeway south of Pakenham. The next stage is the eventual duplication of the bypass, its linking to the South Gippsland Highway, and then the conversion of the road to Pakenham; more planning is required before any further progress is to be made.

Major intersections
Koo Wee Rup Bypass is entirely contained within the Shire of Cardinia local government area.

See also

References

Highways and freeways in Melbourne
Bypasses in Australia
Transport in the Shire of Cardinia